This is a list of the best-selling albums in France that have been certified by the Syndicat National de l'Édition Phonographique (SNEP).

Diamond album certifications
The SNEP provides "certifications" for album sales, similar to the RIAA's. Diamond awards were instituted November 1, 1988.

List of albums certified Diamond in France

List of best-selling albums in France by claimed sales

Notes

References

Lists of best-selling albums